Anthony Bluff is a conspicuous rock bluff along the south wall of Mulock Glacier, Antarctica, about  northwest of Cape Lankester. It was mapped by the United States Geological Survey from tellurometer surveys and from U. S. Navy air photos, 1959–63, and was named by the Advisory Committee on Antarctic Names for Captain Alexander Anthony, United States Air Force, in charge of science and publications on the staff of the U.S. Antarctic Projects Officer, 1963–65.

References 

Cliffs of the Ross Dependency
Hillary Coast